The Alaska Star is a weekly newspaper in the Municipality of Anchorage in the U.S. state of Alaska. The Star serves communities north of Anchorage proper (known as "the Anchorage Bowl"), including Eagle River, Chugiak and Eklutna. Since 2011, it has been named the Chugiak-Eagle River Star, the paper's original name when it was founded in 1971. In 2018, Morris Communications sold the Star to the Binkley Co., owner of the Anchorage Daily News.

References

External links
 

1971 establishments in Alaska
Mass media in Anchorage, Alaska
Newspapers published in Alaska
Newspapers established in 1971